The United Arab Emirates competed at the 1992 Summer Olympics in Barcelona, Spain. Thirteen competitors, all men, took part in nineteen events in three sports.

Competitors
The following is the list of number of competitors in the Games.

Athletics

Men's 400m Hurdles
Abdulla Sabt
 Heat — 56.20 (→ did not advance)

Men's 800m
Mohamed Salem Al-Tunaiji
 Heat — 1:53.91 (→ did not advance)

Cycling

Four cyclists represented the United Arab Emirates in 1992.

Men's road race
 Ali Al-Abed
 Mansoor Bu Osaiba
 Khalifa Bin Omair

Men's team time trial
 Ali Al-Abed
 Mansoor Bu Osaiba
 Khamis Harib
 Khalifa Bin Omair

Swimming

References

External links
Official Olympic Reports

Nations at the 1992 Summer Olympics
1992
Summer Olympics